...To the Beat of a Dead Horse is the debut studio album by the American post-hardcore band Touché Amoré. released on August 4, 2009, through 6131 Records. It was produced by Alex Estrada, while the album artwork was created by guitarist Nick Steinhardt. The album features guest appearances from Thursday vocalist Geoff Rickly and Modern Life is War vocalist Jeff Eaton. The songs "Broken Records" and "Honest Sleep" were rerecorded from the band's self-titled demo that was released in 2008.

To celebrate the tenth anniversary of the album, the band re-recorded it in its entirety and released it on August 9, 2019 under the name of Dead Horse X.

Track listing

Personnel
...To the Beat of a Dead Horse personnel adapted from CD liner notes.

Touché Amoré
 Elliot Babin – drums
 Jeremy Bolm – vocals
 Nick Steinhardt – bass
 Clayton Stevens – guitar
 Tyson White – guitar

Additional musicians
 Jeff Eaton (Modern Life Is War) – guest vocals on "Always Running, Never Looking Back"
 Geoff Rickly (Thursday) – guest vocals on "History Reshits Itself"

Production
 Alex Estrada – engineering
 Paul Miner – mastering
 Jeremy Zsupnik – drum tracking

Artwork
 Nick Steinhardt – design, illustration

References

2009 debut albums
Touché Amoré albums